Andrzej Malina (born 11 October 1960) is a Polish former professional wrestler in Greco-Roman style. He won gold medal at the 1986 World Wrestling Championships and was voted the Polish Sports Personality of the Year in 1986.

Career

He was born on 11 October 1960 in Klarysew, near Piaseczno, Polish People's Republic. In 1979, he graduated from high school in Piaseczno and in 1999 from the AWF Gorzów Wielkopolski University. He trained in the Elektronik Piaseczno sports club in the years 1972-79 and then he represented the CWKS Legia Warszawa (1979-1989).

He won gold medal at the 1986 World Wrestling Championships held in Budapest as well as silver and bronze medals at the European Wrestling Championships in Varna and Budapest. He is a four-time Polish champion, first in middleweight division (1980 and 1982) and later in light heavyweight division (1983 and 1985). In 1986, he was chosen the Polish Sportspersonality of the Year, becoming the first wrestler to win the title. He took part in the 1988 Summer Olympics in Seoul representing Poland in the light heavyweight category (90 kg). In 1996, he was awarded the Cross of Merit for his achievements in sport. He worked as an assistant to Ryszard Świerad during the 1996 Summer Olympics in Atlanta where athletes from Poland won five medals in wrestling including three golds.

See also
Polish Sportspersonality of the Year
Sport in Poland
List of Poles

References

1960 births
Living people
Polish wrestlers
Olympic wrestlers of Poland
Wrestlers at the 1988 Summer Olympics
People from Piaseczno County
Sportspeople from Masovian Voivodeship
European Wrestling Championships medalists
World Wrestling Championships medalists
20th-century Polish people